Australian Institute of Sport (AIS) was opened in 1981. AIS Sports Star of the Year (later named AIS Athlete of the Year) was first established in 1983/84 with the first winner being swimmer Karen Phillips.  In 1995, AIS Junior Athlete of the Year was established. Other major awards include AIS Team of The Year, AIS Coach of the Year and AIS Program of the Year.
Other awards included: Sport Achievement Awards, Vocation Awards and Education Awards. There were several memorial scholarship awards that recognise the contribution of deceased AIS athletes, coaches and administrators - Brent Harding Memorial Award for Swimming, Nathan Meade Memorial Award for Diving, Gary Knoke Memorial Award for Athletics, Darren Smith Memorial Award for Road Cycling, Ben Mitchell Medal for AFL and Bob Staunton Memorial Award for Basketball.

The awards were broadened in 2013 to include Direct Athlete Assistance recipients as well as AIS scholarship holders as part of the AIS Winning Edge Strategy. The awards were renamed the AIS Sport Performance Awards (ASPAs) in 2014 with several new awards - Sport Personality of the Year, Para Performance of the Year, Community Club Award and Volunteer/Administrator Award. In 2019, two awards - Sport Personality of the Year  and Sporting Moment of the Year are decided by public vote. There were no awards in 2020 and 2021 due to impact of COVID-19.

AIS Best of the Best

In 2002 as part of the AIS 21st birthday celebrations, 21 athletes were inducted into the AIS 'Best of the Best' hall of Fame. In 2006, four athletes were added and in 2011 another five athletes.

Stuart O'Grady was inducted in 2006 but this was indefinitely suspended on 31 July 2013 due to an admission of doping.

AIS Male Athlete of The Year

AIS Female Athlete of the Year

AIS Emerging Athlete of the Year
This award recognises a talented junior athletes performances during the year. Previously AIS Junior Athlete of the Year.

AIS Team of the Year

AIS Coach of the Year

ABC Sport Personality of the Year
Voted for by the general public.

Team of the Year
Voted for by the general public.

No longer awarded

ABC Best Sporting Moment of The Year
Voted for by the media. Previously called Sport Performance of the Year Award.

AIS Para Performance of the Year

Discontinued and replaced by Male and Famle Para-athlete of the Year

Male Para-athlete of the Year

Female Para-athlete of the Year

High Performance Program of the Year

AIS Leadership Award

Win Well Award

Sport Volunteer of the Year

Sport Australia Award
Award highlighting integrity and sportsmanship in Australian sport.

Athlete Community Engagement Award

AIS World's Best Award
This award may not be awarded annually.

AIS Service Award
This award may not be awarded annually.

Discontinued Awards

AIS Athlete of the Year
Replaced in 2015 by Male and Female Athletes of the Year.

AIS Program of the Year
Discontinued as AIS no longer operates sports scholarship programs.

AIS Volunteer/Administrator Award

AIS Community Club Award

AIS Award - ACT Sports Star of the Year
From 1984 to 2013, ACTSPORT included an AIS Athlete of the Year for athletes on scholarship at the AIS Canberra campus.

See also
 Australian Sport Awards
 Sport Australia Hall of Fame
 ABC Sports Award of the Year
 World Trophy for Australasia
 Sport in Australia

References

Australian Institute of Sport
Australian sports trophies and awards
Awards established in 1984
Australian sports coaching awards
Lists of Australian sportspeople